Cristian Ioan Ponde (born 26 January 1995) is a professional footballer who plays as a forward for Portuguese club S.C. Farense.

Club career
Born in Făurești, Romania, Ponde emigrated to Portugal with his parents before his 10th birthday, and started playing football with S.C. Olhanense. In 2005, he joined Sporting CP to complete his development.

Ponde made his senior debut with the club's reserves on 24 February 2013, coming on as a substitute for fellow youth graduate Ricardo Esgaio for the final 14 minutes of a 5–1 home win against S.C. Freamunde in the Segunda Liga. He scored his first goal as a professional on 30 March of that year, but in a 1–3 home loss to S.L. Benfica B.

On 2 March 2014, during a second-tier game against S.C. Covilhã, Ponde contracted a serious injury to his right knee, going on to be sidelined for several months. His maiden competitive appearance for the first team took place on 21 January 2015, when he played three minutes in a 3–2 defeat at C.F. Os Belenenses in the group stage of the Taça da Liga.

For the 2016–17 season, Ponde was loaned to Covilhã. He then took his game to the Ukrainian Premier League, where he represented FC Karpaty Lviv after signing a three-year contract. He scored his first top-flight goal on 28 October 2018, contributing to the 5–0 away victory over FC Chornomorets Odesa.

Ponde joined Grasshopper Club Zürich on 25 August 2020, on a one-year deal.

International career
Ponde represented Portugal at under-17, under-18 and under-19 levels. He scored in his first appearance for the latter side, a 1–1 draw against Spain in a friendly tournament held in Hungary.

Club statistics

References

External links

1995 births
Living people
People from Maramureș County
Portuguese people of Romanian descent
Romanian emigrants to Portugal
Naturalised citizens of Portugal
Portuguese footballers
Association football forwards
Liga Portugal 2 players
Sporting CP B players
Sporting CP footballers
S.C. Covilhã players
S.C. Farense players
Ukrainian Premier League players
FC Karpaty Lviv players
Swiss Challenge League players
Grasshopper Club Zürich players
Portugal youth international footballers
Portuguese expatriate footballers
Expatriate footballers in Ukraine
Expatriate footballers in Switzerland
Portuguese expatriate sportspeople in Ukraine
Portuguese expatriate sportspeople in Switzerland